The Vulcan American Moth Monoplane was an early parasol-wing monoplane developed by the Doyle brothers.

Development
Wilson Doyle graduated Harvard in 1925, and his brother Harvey from Yale the same year. They moved to Detroit looking for employment in aviation and backing for a new aircraft design. Their first job was working as draftsmen on the ZMC-2 airship, then construction on the Hess H-1 Bluebird line. Ford Trimotor engineer Jan Pavlecka introduced the brothers to William Burke of the Vulcan Last Company, which produced golf clubs among other items. They founded the Vulcan Aircraft Corporation. The name of their first aircraft was chosen to capitalize on the popularity of the de Havilland Tiger Moth.

Design
The American Moth is a strut-braced, high-wing monoplane with conventional landing gear and a tandem open cockpit, requiring the front passenger to enter through the removable backrest between cockpits. The fuselage is made of welded steel tubing with fabric covering. The tapered wings use spruce spars with aluminum wing ribs. The ailerons and elevators used aluminum push-pull tubes rather than cables for control deflection. The standard factory paint scheme was scarlet, red and ivory.

A selection of engines could be fitted; 60 or 90 hp Le Blond, 60 or 80 hp Anzani, or a 70 hp Ryan-Siemens.

Operational history
Pathe News filmed ground runs of the American Moth. The first test flight was flown by Pat Love. Vulcan promoted its aircraft by touring from city to city golf courses having promoter Benny Martinez parachute with a set of Vulcan golf clubs. Martinez eventually broke his leg and Vulcan's chief pilot Pat Love died a year later in a crash. The 3,300 mile tour concluded in March 1928. Later that year, Burke died of a heart attack and the assets of the company were sold to Davis Aircraft in Richmond, Indiana. Dwight Huntington modified the drawings to produce the Davis V-3, Davis D-1, and a custom racer totaling about 60 aircraft built, before the company stopped production in 1929 after a doping-process fueled fire.

Variants
Davis V-3

Specifications (60 hp Le Blond engine)

References

External links
Image of an American Moth

Parasol-wing aircraft
Single-engined tractor aircraft
Aircraft first flown in 1928
1920s United States sport aircraft